Moi, Antoine de Tounens, roi de Patagonie is a 1981 novel by the French writer Jean Raspail. It tells the story of the French adventurer Orélie-Antoine de Tounens, who in 1860 declared the independence of the Kingdom of Araucanía and Patagonia, located in South America, where he held the title of king for the next 18 years. The sovereignty of the country was not respected by Chile and Argentina, whose authorities regarded Tounens as insane. The title of the book means "I, Antoine de Tounens, King of Patagonia".

The novel was published on 2 May 1981 through éditions Albin Michel. It received the 1981 Grand Prix du roman de l'Académie française. It was the basis for the 1990 film Le roi de Patagonie, starring Frédéric van den Driessche and Omar Sharif.

See also
 1981 in literature
 French literature

References

External links
 Moi, Antoine de Tounens, roi de Patagonie at the publisher's website 

1981 French novels
Biographical novels
French novels adapted into films
French-language novels
Novels by Jean Raspail
Novels set in France
Novels set in South America
Novels set in the 1850s
Novels set in the 1860s
Novels set in the 1870s
Éditions Albin Michel books